Stoke Newington Central is a ward in the London Borough of Hackney. It corresponds roughly to Stoke Newington in London, UK and forms part of the Hackney North and Stoke Newington constituency of Diane Abbott MP.

The ward returns three councillors to the borough council, with elections every four years. At the previous election on 6 May 2010 Rita Krishna, Susan Fajana-Thomas and Louisa Thompson all Labour Party candidates, were returned. Turnout was 65%; and 5,674 votes were cast.

In 2001, Stoke Newington Central ward had a total population of 10,143. This compares with the average ward population within the borough of 10,674. At the 2011 Census the population was 12,445.

Ward results

References

External links
 London Borough of Hackney list of constituencies and councilors
 Labour Party profile of Louisa Thomson
 Labour Party profile of Rita Krishna

Wards of the London Borough of Hackney
2014 disestablishments in England
2002 establishments in England
Stoke Newington